EMI domain containing protein 1 is a protein that in humans is encoded by the EMID1 gene.

References

Further reading 

Human proteins